Selena Gomez: My Mind & Me is a 2022 American documentary film that follows singer and actress Selena Gomez during a six year period of her career. The film documents her struggles with fame and her physical and mental well-being in the wake of her diagnosis with lupus and bipolar disorder. It was directed by Alek Keshishian, produced by Lighthouse Media & Management and Interscope Films, and released to Apple TV+ and select theaters on November 4, 2022.

Premiering at the opening night of the AFI Fest on November 2, 2022, Selena Gomez: My Mind & Me was met with a positive critical reception; the documentary was praised for mental health transparency. Accompanying the film's release, "My Mind & Me", a song by Gomez featured in the end credits, was released as a single.

Synopsis
The official synopsis as released by Apple TV+, "After years in the limelight, Selena Gomez achieves unimaginable stardom. But just as she reaches a new peak, an unexpected turn pulls her into darkness. This uniquely raw and intimate documentary spans her six-year journey into a new light."

Cast
 Selena Gomez
 Raquell Stevens, Gomez's close friend of over 10 years

Development
The documentary follows Gomez on a six-year journey starting from around 2015, after Keshishian directed Gomez's "Hands to Myself" music video. Keshishian said: "I had no interest in making a traditional pop doc. I wanted to show something more authentic and Selena did, too. She has a raw vulnerability that captured me ... I had no idea then that it would become a six-year labor of love."

Release and promotion 
Gomez announced the release of her documentary with a short clip posted to her Instagram. The film premiered at the AFI Fest on November 2, 2022, at the TCL Chinese Theatre in Hollywood, and was released two days after on Apple TV+ and in select movie theaters. The trailer for the documentary was released on October 10, which is World Mental Health Day. The trailer included the song "My Mind & Me", released on November 3, 2022; it was performed by Gomez and written by Gomez, Amy Allen, Jon Bellion, Jordan Johnson, Stefan Johnson and Michael Pollack.

Critical reception 
Upon release, Selena Gomez: My Mind & Me, received a highly positive response from critics. The review aggregator website Rotten Tomatoes reported a 97% approval rating based on 36 reviews. On Metacritic, the film received a weighted average score of 68 out of 100, based on 11 critics, indicating "generally favorable reviews".

Chris Azzopardi of The New York Times praised the documentary as an "honest portrait study of stardom and mental illness." He writes the film "offers a hopeful catharsis: How, when we reveal our hardest truths, we can heal together." Writing for IndieWire, David Ehrlich notes the "raw and messy" documentary is "not a movie about healing so much as a movie about learning to hurt in the healthiest way possible. And if its diaristic, inside-out approach has the strange effect of keeping us at a distance, it also invites its most vulnerable young viewers to appreciate that even their favorite superstar is still fighting to be closer to herself." Lovia Gyarkye of The Hollywood Reporter writes "Unlike other music documentaries (a popular format, as of late, for recalibrating celebrity images), Gomez’s project operates at a rawer, grittier register. It’s textured by the 30-year-old star’s relative youth and her attempts to communicate honestly, instead of perfectly." Varietys Chris Willman wrote: "It’s far from the first music doc to reveal that it can be lonely at the top, but it is among the few to convey that there are no easy answers for that when mental illness is at the root. Of all the portrayals of pop superstars that have been produced in-house in recent years, “My Mind & Me” is probably the one with the least celebratory third act … which is something to celebrate."

Accolades

See also
 List of Apple TV+ original films

References

External links
 

Selena Gomez
2022 films
2022 documentary films
2020s American films
2020s English-language films
American documentary films
Apple TV+ original films
Documentary films about actors
Documentary films about singers
Documentary films about women in music
Films directed by Alek Keshishian